Judith Forca Ariza (born 7 June 1996) is a Spanish female water polo player who won the silver medal at the 2017 World Championships in Budapest and at the 2019 World Championships in Gwangju.

See also
 List of World Aquatics Championships medalists in water polo

References

External links
 
  

Spanish female water polo players
Living people
Place of birth missing (living people)
1996 births
Water polo players at the 2016 Summer Olympics
Water polo players at the 2020 Summer Olympics
World Aquatics Championships medalists in water polo
Medalists at the 2020 Summer Olympics
Olympic silver medalists for Spain in water polo
21st-century Spanish women
Sportspeople from Sabadell
Water polo players from Catalonia
Sportswomen from Catalonia